Joseph Billioud (1  August 1888 – 7 March 1963) was a 20th-century French historian. The historian Jacques Billioud was his son and Jean-Michel Billioud, a writer and Yves Billioud, a lawyer, his grandsons

Biography 
A student at École nationale des chartes, he graduated as archivist paleographer with a thesis entitled « Les États du duché de Bourgogne jusqu'en 1498 » (class 1911).
Appointed chief curator of the library and archives of the city of Marseille, he authored more than 300 articles on the history of art and the economic life of Marseille and Provence. In 1950, along other scholars, he founded the Institut historique de Provence, the review Provence historique (organe de la Fédération historique de Provence) of which he became first director.

Publications 
1922: Les états de Bourgogne aux XIVe et XVe siècles
1924: Manuscrits à Enluminures exécutés pour des Bibliothèques Provençales (890-1704.)
1924: Les Manuscrits Liturgiques Provençaux du XIVe siècle, Mémoires de l'Institut Historique de Provence
1925: Le Roi des merciers du Comté de Provence aux XIV° et XV° siècles..., Bulletin philologique et historique
1926: Statuts des merciers de Provence à la fin du XV° siècle, Mémoires de l'Institut Historique de Provence
1929: De la confrérie à la corporation, les classes industrielles en Provence aux XIVe, XVe et XVIe siècles, Mémoires de l'Institut Historique de ProvencePaul-Marie Bondois, 
1931: La reprise de Toulon (1793) et l'opinion publique, in Mémoire I.H.P., (p. 249) (compte rendu d'ouvrage - Parès J.)
1932: Pals ou lys des plus anciens emblèmes du comté de Provence1934: Les Gérard, architectes marseillais, Marseille, impr. Guéneux frères ; Éditions du Vieux-Marseille
1937: Un Latour marseillais : Pierre Bernard (1704-1777), Gazette des beaux-arts, XI.1937, (pp. 237-252) (cf. table des matières, deuxième semestre 1937)
1938: Un peintre de types populaires : Françoise Duparc de Marseille, (1726-1778)
1951: Histoire du commerce de Marseille  publiée par la Chambre de commerce de Marseille sous la direction de Gaston Rambert, tome III. De 1480 à 1515, par Raymond Collier, de 1515 à 1599, par Joseph Billioud, Paris, Plon
1952: Le Commerce de la glace naturelle à Marseille aux XVIIe et XVIIIe siècles..., Actes du 77e Congrès des Sociétés savantes. Grenoble
1962: Une médaille commémorative du combat devant Toulon (22 février 1744) in Provence Histoire, fascicule 47, 1962, (pp. 66-67) in Héraldique - Numismatique

 References 

 Bibliography 
 Joseph Billioud, in Provence historique, tome 13, fascicule 54, 1963 read online.

 External links 
 Jacques Billioud, Bibliographie de Joseph Billioud, 1888-1963 (272 titles) on provence-historique.mmsh.univ-aix.fr''.

1888 births
1963 deaths
People from Grièges
20th-century French historians
École Nationale des Chartes alumni